Fishburn was built at Whitby in 1780. the largest of the three First Fleet storeships.

Career
Fishburn appeared in the 1781 volume of Lloyd's Register with Gill, master, J.Pierton, owner, and trade Cork-based transport.  Lloyd's List reported on 15 March 1785 that Fishburn had been driven on the Jarron Slake, but that it was hoped she would be gotten off with little damage. 

In 1777 she became a storeship with the First Fleet to Botany Bay. Fishburn carried 22 crew, though five deserted before the vessel departed England.

Fishburn left Portsmouth on 13 May 1787, and arrived at Port Jackson on 26 January 1788.  She left Port Jackson on 19 November 1788, keeping company with Golden Grove until losing sight of her on 11 April 1789 after several days at the Falkland Islands for recovery of crew members who were sick with scurvy. She arrived back in England on 25 May 1789. The fate of Fishburn is unknown; she appears to have disappeared from the records after being discharged from Her Majesty's service at Deptford, nine days after her arrival.

There is a monument to Fishburn in the First Fleet Memorial Gardens at Wallabadah, New South Wales. An Urban Transit Authority First Fleet ferry was named after Fishburn in 1985.

See also
Journals of the First Fleet

References

Further reading
 Bateson, Charles, The Convict Ships, 1787–1868, Sydney, 1974.

External links
  [CC-By-SA]

1780 ships
Ships built in Whitby
Ships of the First Fleet